Asphalt: Urban GT is a racing video game for the Nintendo DS and the Nokia N-Gage handheld video game consoles. Best known as the first major game of Asphalt series, it was developed and published by Gameloft, and released on November 15, 2004, making it one of the Nintendo DS launch titles. It has support for wireless multiplayer with up to four opponents, and takes advantage of the DS's support for 3D graphics (while showing unaccelerated N-Gage's power to match DS's graphics), showing the action from three camera angles. Replays are also available. The bottom screen of the DS is utilized to provide strategic tips and player info.

The game sports nine tracks modelled after real-world locations such as Paris, New York City, Miami, Las Vegas, Cuba, Bogota, Chernobyl, Hong Kong and Texas Motor Speedway. The game's 23 cars are licensed from 14 real manufacturers such as Lamborghini, Hummer, Volkswagen, Nissan, Ford (Shelby), Audi, Aston Martin, Jaguar, Lotus, Morgan, TVR, Chevrolet, Saleen, and others including some of the fictional in-game manufacturers, and can be enhanced with over 30 add-ons. Game modes include instant play, road challenge, free race, time attack, and cop chase. In cop chase, the player takes the role of the police attempting to arrest the other racers.

Reception

The N-Gage version received "favorable" reviews, while the DS version received "mixed" reviews, according to video game review aggregator Metacritic.  In Japan, Famitsu gave the latter version a score of one six and three sevens for a total of 27 out of 40.

It received a runner-up position in GameSpots 2004 "Best N-Gage Game" award category, losing to Colin McRae Rally 2005.

Sequels
A sequel to the game was later released. Gameloft later developed further titles in the series, the majority of them were released for mobile devices, with Asphalt 4: Elite Racing being the first to be released for the iOS, and Asphalt 5 marking the first Asphalt series game to be developed and released for Android.

A direct conversion of Asphalt 6: Adrenaline entitled Asphalt 3D for the Nintendo 3DS was released to mixed reception. Similarly, Asphalt: Injection for the PlayStation Vita featured tracks from Adrenaline and was released in December 2011. Starting with Adrenaline, ports of the games for personal computers were also developed and released, although only Adrenaline saw an OS X version, with subsequent games in the series being released for Microsoft Windows.

A free-to-play spinoff entitled Asphalt Overdrive was released for iOS and Android in September 2014. Unlike prior titles in the series, the game is presented as an "endless runner" in the vein of Temple Run and Subway Surfers, and does not offer a traditional racing mode.

References

External links
 
 

2004 video games
Mobile games
N-Gage games
Nintendo DS games
Asphalt (series)
Ubisoft games
Video games developed in France
Symbian software games
Gameloft games
Multiplayer and single-player video games
Video games about police officers
Video games set in California
Video games set in Colombia
Video games set in Cuba
Video games set in Hong Kong
Video games set in Iraq
Video games set in the Las Vegas Valley
Video games set in Miami
Video games set in New York City
Video games set in Paris
Video games set in Russia
Video games set in Sicily
Video games set in Texas
Video games set in Tokyo
Video games set in Ukraine